Middle Creek may refer to the following streams:

in Australia
 Middle Creek (New South Wales)

in the United States
Middle Creek (California), a tributary of Cerrito Creek in Alameda County, California
Middle Creek (Lake County, California), a tributary of Clear Lake, Lake County, California
Middle Creek (Toms Creek tributary), a tributary of Toms Creek in Pennsylvania and Maryland
Middle Creek (Cocalico Creek tributary), a tributary of Cocalico Creek in Pennsylvania
Middle Creek (Lackawaxen River tributary), a tributary of the Lackawaxen River in Pennsylvania
Middle Creek (Penns Creek tributary), a tributary of Penns Creek in Pennsylvania
Middle Creek (Schwaben Creek tributary), a tributary of Schwaben Creek in Pennsylvania

See also